Ypthima singala, the jewel four-ring or Sinhalese five-ring, is a species of Satyrinae butterfly. It is endemic to Sri Lanka and south India.

Description
Adult Ypthima singala show sexual dimorphism. In male specimens, the dorsal surface of both wings is brownish and one large eye-spot and a series of smaller eyespots are found on the ventral surface of the forewing. This large eyespot can be seen very faintly on the dorsal surface. In female specimens, a prominent eye-spot is found on the dorsal surface of the forewing. Few small eyespots are found above the outer margin of the hind wing. Larval food plant is Axonopus compressus.

References

Butterflies of Sri Lanka
Butterflies described in 1868
Ypthima